B51 or B-51 may refer to:
 HLA-B51, an HLA-B serotype
 Bundesstraße 51, a road in western Germany
 Martin XB-51, an American airplane
 Sicilian Defence, in the Encyclopaedia of Chess Openings
 B51 (New York City bus)